TDW may refer to one of the following:

 TDW (Gesellschaft für verteidigungstechnische Wirksysteme), a European weapons manufacturer;
 Three-Day Week, one of several measures introduced in the United Kingdom by the Conservative Government of 1970–1974 to help conserve electricity;
 The Dark World, a science fantasy novel by Henry Kuttner;
 Tidewater Inc. (NYSE:TDW), an international petroleum service company;
 The Daily WTF, a humorous blog on software engineering disasters;
 Borland Turbo Debugger for Windows 3